Orion is a quarterly, advertisement-free, nonprofit magazine focused on nature, culture, and place addressing environmental and societal issues.

It has published such authors as Wendell Berry, Barry Lopez, Terry Tempest Williams, Michael Pollan, Mark Kurlansky, Derrick Jensen, Sandra Steingraber, Gretel Ehrlich, Bill McKibben, Barbara Kingsolver, Rebecca Solnit,  Cormac Cullinan, Erik Reece, James Howard Kunstler and E. O. Wilson.

In 2010, Orion was the recipient of Utne Reader magazine's Utne Independent Press Award for General Excellence.

Orion Book Award
Since 2007, the magazine has administered an annual book award competition, which is described by the magazine as "given annually to a book that addresses the human relationship with the natural world in a fresh, thought provoking, and engaging manner. Four additional books are named as finalists."

References

External links

Online magazines published in the United States
Cultural magazines published in the United States
Environmental magazines
Magazines established in 1982
American environmental websites
Bimonthly magazines published in the United States
Magazines published in Massachusetts
Advertising-free magazines
1982 establishments in the United States